Makoto Kawashima (川島　誠), born May 2, 1979, is a Japanese retired professional ice hockey Defenceman who spent his entire professional career with the Oji Eagles in the Japan Ice Hockey League and later in Asia League Ice Hockey. He also played for the Japan national team in five Ice Hockey World Championships.

References

1979 births
Japanese ice hockey defencemen
Living people
Oji Eagles players
People from Obihiro, Hokkaido
Sportspeople from Hokkaido
Asian Games gold medalists for Japan
Asian Games silver medalists for Japan
Medalists at the 2003 Asian Winter Games
Medalists at the 2011 Asian Winter Games
Ice hockey players at the 2003 Asian Winter Games
Ice hockey players at the 2011 Asian Winter Games
Asian Games medalists in ice hockey